Hinton is a city in Summers County, West Virginia, United States. The population was 2,266 at the 2020 census. It is the county seat of Summers County. Hinton was established in 1873 and chartered in 1897. Hinton was named after John "Jack" Hinton, the original owner of the town site. Much of Hinton's downtown was placed on the National Register of Historic Places in 1984.

Part of Paramount's 1994 film Lassie was shot in Hinton.

Geography
Hinton is situated along the New River just north of its confluence with the Greenbrier River. Bluestone Lake is located near Hinton. The city is about 28 miles from Beckley and 90 miles from Charleston.

Climate
The climate in this area has mild differences between highs and lows, and there is adequate rainfall year-round.  According to the Köppen Climate Classification system, Hinton has a marine west coast climate, abbreviated "Cfb" on climate maps.

Demographics

2010 census
As of the census of 2010, there were 2,676 people, 1,276 households, and 676 families living in the city. The racial makeup of the city was 92.0% White, 5.3% African American, 0.1% Native American, 0.4% Asian, and 2.0% from two or more races. Hispanic or Latino of any race were 0.5% of the population.

There were 1,276 households, of which 21.9% had children under the age of 18 living with them, 34.8% were married couples living together, 13.2% had a female householder with no husband present, 4.9% had a male householder with no wife present, and 47.0% were non-families. 42.9% of all households were made up of individuals, and 22% had someone living alone who was 65 years of age or older. The average household size was 2.07 and the average family size was 2.83.

The median age in the city was 46 years. 19.4% of residents were under the age of 18; 6.9% were between the ages of 18 and 24; 22.3% were from 25 to 44; 28.2% were from 45 to 64; and 23.2% were 65 years of age or older. The gender makeup of the city was 46.6% male and 53.4% female.

2000 census
As of the census of 2000, there were 2,880 people, 1,357 households, and 755 families living in the city. The population density was 1,244.5 people per square mile (481.4/km2). There were 1,595 housing units at an average density of 689.2 per square mile (266.6/km2). The racial makeup of the city was 92.43% White, 5.49% African American, 0.52% Native American, 0.21% Asian, 0.10% Pacific Islander, 0.07% from other races, and 1.18% from two or more races. Hispanic or Latino of any race were 0.73% of the population.

There were 1,357 households, out of which 19.4% had children under the age of 18 living with them, 40.1% were married couples living together, 12.6% had a female householder with no husband present, and 44.3% were non-families. 41.3% of all households were made up of individuals, and 22.7% had someone living alone who was 65 years of age or older. The average household size was 2.10 and the average family size was 2.85.

In the city, the population was spread out, with 19.4% under the age of 18, 7.3% from 18 to 24, 22.8% from 25 to 44, 24.3% from 45 to 64, and 26.2% who were 65 years of age or older. The median age was 45 years. For every 100 females, there were 82.6 males. For every 100 females age 18 and over, there were 79.2 males.

The median income for a household in the city was $20,323, and the median income for a family was $25,769. Males had a median income of $23,654 versus $25,543 for females. The per capita income for the city was $13,909. About 22.6% of families and 27.6% of the population were below the poverty line, including 35.1% of those under age 18 and 15.2% of those age 65 or over.

Arts and culture

There are several museums in Hinton, including the Veterans Memorial Museum, the Hinton Railroad Museum, and King's Civil War Museum. The City of Hinton is currently restoring the CSX passenger depot and the Freight Depot to be used as possible tourist draws in the future. City of Hinton Parks and recreation department has a water park complete with a water slide and swimming pool. They also have a 10,000 sq ft public fitness center.

Economy
Major employers in Hinton include Summers Nursing & Rehabilitation Center,  Summers County ARH, CSX Transportation, Summers County Schools, ManTech International, and Kroger.

Rail transportation

Amtrak, the national passenger rail service, provides service to Hinton under the Cardinal route.  CSX owns the rail line through Hinton, which is the mainline of the former Chesapeake and Ohio Railway. Hinton was a major terminal for the C&O.

Notable people
Sylvia Mathews Burwell, 22nd United States Secretary of Health and Human Services
Jack Warhop, Major League Baseball player
John Davis Chandler, American actor
Dick Leftridge, National Football League player for the Pittsburgh Steelers

References

External links
 City of Hinton website

Cities in West Virginia
Cities in Summers County, West Virginia
County seats in West Virginia